Đilasism refers to the Yugoslav communist politics of the influence of Yugoslav communist Milovan Đilas.


Theory 
Some within the leadership of the SKJ viewed these articles as "heresies". Several members of the Central Committee of the SKJ were in agreement with Đilas' ideas, and during later political investigations one even confessed that he had "written an article propagating Djilasism." Đilas criticised bureaucracy as the "privileged class", where the source of this privilege came from its absolutism and it would use ideological repression to preserve this privilege. He also believed that the party and state should be separate entities, and along with Edvard Kardelj, that in time political opposition would be allowed as the state and the party withered away.

Pejorative and repression 
The word was often used as pejorative, including by Tito, while Đilas himself personally denied that such an ideology existed.

Several publications were suppressed and journalists arrested on the grounds that they were "Đilasist". These included the magazines Beseda edited by Ivan Minatti, and Revija 57 edited by Veljko Rus.

See also 
 New class

References

Bibliography

External links 
 The Djilas Case Archive at Marxists Internet Archive.

Democratic socialism
Eponymous political ideologies
League of Communists of Yugoslavia
Types of socialism